Jalpaiguri is a city in the Indian state of West Bengal. It is the headquarters of the Jalpaiguri district as well as of the Jalpaiguri division of West Bengal, covering the jurisdiction of the five districts of North Bengal. The city is located on the banks of the Teesta River which is the second largest river in West Bengal after the Ganges, on the foothills of the Himalayas. The city is the home to the circuit bench of the Kolkata High Court, the other seat being at Port Blair in the Andaman and Nicobar Islands. Jalpaiguri features the Jalpaiguri Government Engineering College, the second campus of the University of North Bengal and the Biswa Bangla Krirangan/ Jalpaiguri Sports Village. The merging of the two cities makes it the largest metropolis of the region.

Etymology 
The name "Jalpaiguri" comes from the word "Jalpai" meaning olive, which grew in the city and adjacent areas. And "Guri" means a place.

Geography
Jalpaiguri is the district headquarter of Jalpaiguri District. It is situated at a height of 89m(292ft) from Mean Sea Level. 
The city lies very close to the Himalayas and on the left bank of Teesta river. The Karla river is another major river of Jalpaiguri which flows through the city.

Climate

Temperature
The annual average temperature of Jalpaiguri city is 24.8 °C. In summer, the temperature varies from a minimum of 20-22 °C to a maximum of 28-34 °C. August is the hottest month with an average temperature of 29.1 °C. The temperature in July, August sometimes exceed 35 °C. The highest temperature ever recorded in Jalpaiguri was 41 °C, was recorded on 13 August 2019. The winter maximum temperature here hovers around 22-25 °C and minimum drops 8-12 °C. The minimum temperature sometimes falls below 7 °C. The lowest temperature ever dropped in Jalpaiguri city was 2.2 °C, was recorded on 5 February 1914.

Rainfall and other conditions
As Jalpaiguri is located on the base of the Himalayas, the city receives a high amount of rainfall throughout the year. The average annual rainfall is approximately 3400 mm. A distinct season, monsoon is observed from June to September. About 965.7 mm rain falls in July. Though the amount plummets to 6.6 mm in December. On an average, the rainy days in Jalpaiguri city are 100. The heaviest one-day rainfall occurred on 10 July 1999 when 474 mm rain fell in the city. The wettest month was July 1996. In that month, a total of 1546.2 mm of rain was received. Jalpaiguri doesn't get snowfall. Humidity is very high in the air.

Demographics 
According to the 2011 census, Jalpaiguri had a population of 107,341 people (53,708 male and 53,633 female) while the Metropolitan region had a population of 169,002 people (85,226 males and 83,787 females). The population for children aged 0-6 was 14,522. Effective literacy rate for people aged 7+ was 86.43 per cent.

Civic administration 
Civic administration is the responsibility of the Jalpaiguri Municipality which is the sixth oldest in West Bengal after that of Kolkata, Howrah, Berhampore, Burdwan and Siuri. Set up in 1885, it is headed by a chairman who is elected by the residents of the city. It has 25 wards that elect the ward councilors. The All India Trinamool Congress is in the power of this municipal body. The chairperson of the municipality is Papia Pal.

Economy 
Jalpaiguri has its own bank, the Jalpaiguri Central Co-operative Bank, whose head office is located at Temple Street of the city. Founded in 1919, it has more than 20 branches with ATMs spread across the District.

Utility services 
The municipality is responsible for providing basic services, such as potable water and sanitation. The water is supplied by the municipal authorities using its groundwater resources, and almost all the houses in the municipal area are connected through the system.

Transport

Rail 
Jalpaiguri city region has four important railway stations:-
 Jalpaiguri Town is the oldest station in the area.
 Jalpaiguri Road was opened in 1944 and is the primarily crucial railway station of the city.
 Mohitnagar lies at Mohitnagar in the Haldibari-New Jalpaiguri line.
 Raninagar Jalpaiguri Junction is situated at the further western part of the city. The railway station serves Jalpaiguri, Raninagar and other nearby places.

Road 

The Asian Highway 2 and the National Highway 31D [NH 27 (New Numbering)] passes just through the city connecting it right with the rest of the country.

The Netaji Subhash Chandra Bose Central Bus Terminus situated next to the North Bengal State Transport Corporation (NBSTC) Bus Terminal is a major stop for most private and state-owned buses in the region. The Royal Government of Bhutan also operates buses from Jalpaiguri to its border town Jaigaon/ Phuentsholing, Bhutan. Air-conditioned sleeper coach bus service is also available from Jalpaiguri to Kolkata (Banglashree Express). There are several bus stands in Jalpaiguri:-
 NBSTC Depot: Government buses are available from here.
 Kadamtala Bus Terminus: Private buses to Siliguri and Islampur are available from here.
 Super Bus Stand near the Jalpaiguri railway station – Super (or non-stop) bus services to Siliguri are available from here.
 Netaji Subhas Chandra Bose Private Bus Terminus: Buses to the Dooars region, i.e., Malbazar, Birpara, are available from here.
 Bowbazaar Bus Stand: Bus services to Haldibari are available from here.

Education 

Jalpaiguri's schools are run by the state government or private organisations, many of which are religious. Bengali and English are the primary languages of instruction; Nepali and Hindi are also used. Schools in Jalpaiguri follow the "10+2+3" plan. After completing their secondary education, students typically enroll in schools that have a higher secondary facility and are affiliated with the West Bengal Council of Higher Secondary Education, the Indian Certificate of Secondary Education (ICSE), or the Central Board of Secondary Education (CBSE). They usually choose a focus on liberal arts, business, or science. Vocational programs are also available. In 2012, the Government proposed a medical college for the suburb of Paharpur.

Colleges include the Ananda Chandra College, Ananda Chandra College of Commerce, P.D. Women's College, St. Xavier's College, all of which are affiliated with the University of North Bengal. Also, since 2011, the second campus of the university with the same name provides with master's degrees in arts, sciences, and commerce. Jalpaiguri Polytechnic Institute, is a Government Diploma level institute with 3 yrs.(10+) Civil, Electrical, Mechanical & Automobile Engineering and 2 yrs.(12+) The Institute of Pharmacy, Jalpaiguri is the pharmacy college which offers pharmacy courses under West Bengal State Council of Technical Education, Kolkata. There is also an industrial training institute in the city. Jalpaiguri Law College is the city's law college. The construction of the new medical college has shortly began in the Paharpur suburb of the city.

The Jalpaiguri Government Engineering College is an autonomous institution of the Government of West Bengal, one of premier technical institutes is present in Jalpaiguri, best known for scientists like Promode R. Bandyopadhyay. It is located near the National Highway 27 (West Bengal State Highway 12A) at Denguajhar, Jalpaiguri. The institute is one of the oldest institutes of engineering in the state.

Notable people 
 
 
 Promode R. Bandyopadhyay, Indian born American inventor, research scientist and Technical Program Manager at the Naval Undersea Warfare Center, New Port, Rhode Island, USA 
 P. K. Banerjee, Indian footballer and coach who represented India at the international level.
 Swapna Barman, the heptathlete was born here.
 Ratan Lal Basu, a fiction writer in English.
 Moushumi Bhowmik, the eminent singer-songwriter was born here.
 Mimi Chakraborty, Tollywood actress and Member of Parliament from Jadavpur constituency.
 Sukalyan Ghosh Dastidar, Indian footballer of the 1970s
 Bappi Lahiri, Indian singer.
 Samaresh Majumdar, Bengali author of novels like Uttoradhikar, Kalpurush, and Kaalbela.
 Khaleda Zia, Former Prime Minister of Bangladesh during 1991 to 1996 & 2001 to 2006 and leader of Bangladesh Nationalist Party.

See also 
 Roman Catholic Diocese of Jalpaiguri
 Cities and towns in West Bengal

References

External links 

 
 Official website of Jalpaiguri Municipality 
 Official website of Jalpaiguri district
 West Bengal Jalpaiguri District
 Siliguri Jalpaiguri Development Authority

 
Cities and towns in Jalpaiguri district
Former capital cities in India
Cities in West Bengal